Gymnothorax equatorialis is a moray eel found in the eastern Pacific ocean, from the Gulf of California to Peru. It was first named by Hildebrand in 1946, and is commonly known as the spotted-tail moray or the spottail moray.

References

equatorialis
Fish described in 1946